Warwickshire 3 was a tier 10 English Rugby Union league with teams from Warwickshire taking part.  Promoted teams moved up to Warwickshire 2 and there was no relegation.  Following restructuring of the Warwickshire leagues at the end of 1991–92 season, Warwickshire 3 was cancelled and the teams transferred into the newly introduced Staffordshire/Warwickshire 3 or Staffordshire/Warwickshire 4.

Original teams

When league rugby began in 1987 this division contained the following teams:

Alcester
AP Lockheed
Caludon Castle
Coventrians
Coventry Post Office
Coventry Technical
Old Warwickians
Shipston-on-Stour
Shottery
Warwick

Warwickshire 3 honours

Warwickshire 3 was a tier 10 league with promotion up to Warwickshire 2 and there was no relegation.  At the end of the 1991–92 season the merging of all Staffordshire and Warwickshire leagues meant that Warwickshire 3 was discontinued.

Number of league titles

Alcester (1)
Coventrians (1)
Lanchester Polytechnic (1)
Pinley (1)
Rugby Welsh (1)

See also
Warwickshire 1
Warwickshire 2
Midlands RFU
Warwickshire RFU
English rugby union system
Rugby union in England

Notes

References

Defunct rugby union leagues in England
Rugby union in Warwickshire
Sports leagues established in 1987
Sports leagues disestablished in 1992